Pelayo Roza Fonticiella (born 4 May 1996) is a Spanish sprint canoeist.

He won a bronze medal at the 2018 ICF Canoe Sprint World Championships.
Also he won a bronze medal at the 2018 Canoe Sprint European Championships.

References

1996 births
Spanish male canoeists
Living people
ICF Canoe Sprint World Championships medalists in kayak
Sportspeople from Gijón
21st-century Spanish people